Now's the Time is an album by saxophonist Houston Person and bassist Ron Carter that was released by Muse in 1990.

Track listing 
 "Bemsha Swing" (Thelonious Monk, Denzil Best) – 5:25	
 "Spring Can Really Hang You Up the Most" (Tommy Wolf, Fran Landesman) – 5:09	
 "Einbahnstrasse" (Ron Carter) – 5:03
 "Memories of You" (Eubie Blake, Andy Razaf) – 4:55
 "Quiet Nights" (Antônio Carlos Jobim) – 6:47
 "If You Could See Me Now" (Tadd Dameron, Carl Sigman) – 6:38
 "Now's the Time" (Charlie Parker) – 3:50
 "Since I Fell for You" (Buddy Johnson) – 7:11
 "Little Waltz" (Carter) – 3:35

Personnel 
 Houston Person – tenor saxophone 
 Ron Carter – double bass

References 

Houston Person albums
Ron Carter albums
1990 albums
Muse Records albums
Albums recorded at Van Gelder Studio